Al Simmons (1902–1956) was an American baseball player.

Al Simmons may also refer to:
Al Simmons (musician) (born 1948), Canadian children's performer
Al Simmons (ice hockey) (born 1951), Canadian NHL player
 Al Simmons, real name of Spawn, an Image Comics character